The Mutual Savings Bank Building, is a building located at 700 Market Street at the corner of Kearny, Market, and Geary Streets in the Financial District in San Francisco, California. It was built in 1902 and was designed by architect,  William F. Curlett in the French Renaissance Revival style. The 12-story building was one of San Francisco earliest skyscrapers. The building was added to the National Register of Historic Places on January 22, 2014.

History

The Mutual Savings Bank was founded in 1889 by James Phelan, James D. Phelan, James G. Fair, James K. Moffitt, and other directors. In 1900, the bank commission architect,  William F. Curlett, to design a building for the prominent corner of Market and Kearny Streets. It was completed in 1902 as the third largest building in San Francisco with 12-stories. The Mahony Bros. supervised the construction, which has a steel framework throughout, two stories of Raymond granite, and ten stories of Colusa sandstone, limestone and terracotta with a mansard roof.

The building survived the 1906 San Francisco earthquake and suffered only moderate damage. The repair was supervised by William Curlett.

The Mutual Savings Bank building was sold to the First Federal Trust Company, a subsidiary of the First Federal National Bank in 1919. The building was then sold to the Esberg family in October 1919. Later that year the property was purchased by real-estate mogul George Whittell Sr., founder of the Whittell Reality Company. The building was owned and managed for the next fifty years by the Whittell Reality Co.

In 1961, Citizens' Savings & Loan Association purchased the Mutual Savings Bank Building and the neighboring Flannery Building.

Preservation

In 1964, Charles W. Moore was hired as the lead architect to build a 12-story reinforced-concrete annex in the Modern or early Postmodern style. Moore convinced the bankers to retain the old Mutual Savings Bank Building and construct an addition on the site of the old five-story H. P. Flannery Building. This decision was unusual during the height of High Corporate Modernism when older skyscrapers in San Francisco were being torn down and replaced.

In 2013, a ten-story addition was designed by Charles F. Bloszies to retain the 1902 building's historic integrity. The design complied with the Secretary of the Interior's Standards for Rehabilitation. The addition is left of the Mutual Savings Bank building. The structure of the new building is classical, with metal fins that project out as sunscreens above the windows on the south-facing elevation. The roof terrace of the new addition has a privately owned public space (POPOS), with an rooftop garden and views of the city.

The Mutual Savings Bank Building was added to the National Register of Historic Places in 2014.

See also
 National Register of Historic Places listings in San Francisco

References

External links

 Mutual Savings Bank Building in San Francisco
 One Kearny

Buildings and structures in San Francisco
Financial District, San Francisco
Commercial buildings completed in 1902
National Register of Historic Places in San Francisco
Bank buildings on the National Register of Historic Places in California
1900s architecture in the United States
Renaissance Revival architecture in California
1908 establishments in California